This is a list of notable aerospace engineers, people who were trained in or practiced aerospace engineering and design.



A 
 Gerd Achgelis (1908–1991) – helicopter pioneer
 Jakob Ackeret (1898–1981) 
 Bruce Aikenhead (1923–2019) – Avro Canada, NASA
 Buzz Aldrin (born 1930) – astronaut, mechanical engineer and second person to walk on the moon
 Rostislav Alexeyev (1916–1980) – ground effect vehicle designer
 Edmund T. Allen (1896–1943) – engineer, test pilot
 Harry Julian Allen (1910–1977) – NASA, inventor of blunt body re-entry vehicles
  (1917–1993)
 Oleg Antonov (1906–1984) – founder of the Antonov design bureau
 Neil Armstrong (1930–2012) – astronaut, aeronautical engineer and first person to walk on the moon
 Yuri Artsutanov (1929–2019) – space elevator pioneer
 Holt Ashley (1923–2006) – researched aeroelasticity
 Lee Atwood (1904–1999) – North American Aviation engineer

B 
 Erich Bachem (1906–1960) – designer of the Bachem Ba 349 Natter rocket plane
 Leonard Bairstow (1880–1963) – National Physical Laboratory (United Kingdom) researcher
 Herman Barkey (1909–2005) – led the design team for the McDonnell Aircraft F-4 Phantom.
 V. P. Barmin (1909–1993) – designer of the rocket launch complex
 Frank Barnwell (1880–1938) – chief engineer Bristol Aeroplane Company
 Robert Ludvigovich Bartini (1897–1974) – designer of the Bartini Beriev VVA-14 and other experimental projects
  (1914–2005) – Aermacchi MB-326 designer
 Jim Bede (1933–2015)
 Rex Beisel (1893–1972) – lead engineer at Curtiss and Vought
 Giuseppe Mario Bellanca (1886–1960) – aircraft pioneer, blended wing designer
 Dwight Henry Bennett (1917–2002) – developed Fly-by-wire technology, helped design the F2Y, F-102, F-4 Phantom, F/A-18
 Thomas W. Benoist (1874–1917) – early airline entrepreneur
 Igor Bensen (1917–2000) – autogyro designer
 Max Bentele (1909–2006) – jet engine pioneer
 Georgy Beriev (1903–1979) – founder of the Beriev design bureau
 J. D. Bernal (1901–1971) - invented the Bernal sphere for space habitation
 Albert Betz (1885–1968) – designer and researcher
 Paul Bevilaqua (born 1945) – lift fan inventor
 Robert Blackburn (1885–1955) – aviation pioneer
 Louis Blériot (1872–1936) – aviation pioneer
 George Eugene Bockrath (1911–1998) – researched fracture mechanics
 Hendrik Wade Bode (1905–1982) – NASA advisor
 Jenny Body – former President of the Royal Aeronautical Society
 William Boeing (1881–1956) – founder of Boeing
 Charles Bolden (born 1946) – NASA Administrator
 Ludwig Bölkow (1912–2003) – aerodynamicist for the Me 262
 Alan Bond (born 1944) – designed spaceplanes and an SST
 Philip Bono (1921–1993) – space launcher developer 
 Frank Borman (born 1928) – first man to circle the Moon
 Karel Bossart (1904–1975) – lead designer of the Atlas ICBM
 Enea Bossi Sr. (1888–1963) – aviation pioneer
 William Hawley Bowlus (1896–1967) – glider designer
 Frances Bradfield (1895–1967) - wind tunnel researcher
 Louis Charles Breguet (1880–1955) – aviation pioneer, founder of Bréguet Aviation
 Maurice Brennan (1913–1986) – designer of flying boats, helicopters, transports, rockets, hovercraft
 Yvonne Brill (1924–2013) – electrothermal hydrazine thruster
 Arthur E. Bryson (born 1925) – "father of modern optimal control theory"
  (1895–1976) – founder of Bücker-Flugzeugbau GmbH
 Isabelle Buret – engineer specializing in telecommunications and astronautics
 Vincent Burnelli (1895–1964) – blended wing and lifting body designer
 Anne Burns (1915–2001) – wind shear expert
 Adolf Busemann (1901–1986) – swept wing
 Robert W. Bussard (1928–2007) – designer of nuclear thermal rocket engines
 Fedor Ivanovich Bylinkin – aviation pioneer

C 
 Sydney Camm (1893–1966) – Hawker Hurricane designer
 Secondo Campini (1904–1980) – jet engine pioneer
 Giovanni Caproni (1886–1957) – founder of Caproni
 Albert Caquot (1881–1976) – aviation pioneer
  (1906–1976) – chief engineer at Dewoitine, designer at Fouga
 Mario Castoldi (1888–1968) – chief designer at Aeronautica Macchi
 Beatrice Mabel Cave-Browne-Cave (1874–1947) – undertook pioneering work in the mathematics of aeronautics
 George Cayley (1773–1857) – notable for his research in aerodynamics
 Clyde Cessna (1879–1954) – early aircraft designer and founder of Cessna
 Roy Chadwick (1893–1947) – design engineer for the Avro Company
 Roger Chaffee (1935–1967) – Apollo 1 fire victim on January 27, 1967
 George Henry Challenger (1881–1947) – engineer with the Bristol Aeroplane Company and later with Vickers
 Jim Chamberlin (1915–1981) – Avro Canada, NASA
 Roy Chaplin (1899–1988) – Hawker Aircraft
 George Chapline Jr. (born 1942) – proposer of a fission-fragment rocket
 Kalpana Chawla (1961–2003) – died in the Columbia disaster
 Vladimir Chelomey (1914–1984) – founded the OKB-52 rocket design bureau
 Boris Ivanovich Cheranovsky (1896–1960) – flying wing designer
  (born 1955) – aerodynamicist
 Boris Chertok (1912–2011) – space program control systems designer
 Chu Chia-Jen (1900–1985)
 Zbysław Ciołkosz (1902–1960) – introduced the use of shaft turbine power for helicopters
 John Drury Clark (1907–1988) – developer of jet and rocket fuel
 Val Cleaver (1917–1977) – rocket engineer
 Henri Coandă (1886–1972) – inventor of the jet engine
 Richard Coar (1921–2013) – RJ10 rocket engine designer
 Dandridge MacFarlan Cole (1921–1965) – Titan II designer
 Giuseppe Colombo (1920–1984) – developed the gravitational assist profile used in the Mariner 10 mission to Mercury, invented the space tether
 Nicholas Comper (1897–1939) – designer of the Comper Swift
 Philip M. Condit (born 1941) – former CEO of Boeing
 René Couzinet (1904–1956) – invented retractable landing gear
 Eugene E. Covert (1926–2015) – wind tunnel designer
 Gaetano Crocco (1877–1968) – rocketry pioneer
 Scott Crossfield (1921–2006) – first man to fly faster than twice the speed of sound in NAA's X-15
 Irv Culver (1911–1999) – P-38 designer
 Glenn Curtiss (1878–1930) – founder of the US aircraft industry
 Kazimierz Czarnecki (1916–2005) - NACA and NASA engineer

D 
 Werner Dahm (1917–2008)
 Frederick Dallenbach – Auxiliary power unit designer
  (1889–1969) – developed solid fuel rocket fuel
 Corradino D'Ascanio (1891–1981) – helicopter pioneer
 Marcel Dassault (1892–1986)
 Serge Dassault (1925–2018)
 Arthur Davenport (1891–1976) - Westland Aircraft
 Stuart Davies (1906–1995) – designed the Avro Lancaster and Vulcan
 Leonardo da Vinci (1452–1519)
 Geoffrey de Havilland (1882–1965)
 Juan de la Cierva (1895–1936) – inventor of the autogyro
 Satish Dhawan (1920–2002)
 Walter Stuart Diehl (1893–1976) - created US Navy test facilities, authored Engineering Aerodynamics
 Paul Bernard Dilworth (1915–2007)
  (born 1947) – sailplane designer
 Heini Dittmar (1911–1960) – record-breaking pilot
 Jurgis Dobkevičius (1900–1926) – Lithuanian aviation constructor, military pilot
 Takeo Doi (1904–1996) – designer for Kawasaki Aircraft Industries
 Tom Dolan – developed the lunar orbit rendezvous concept for the Apollo program 
 Roy Dommett (1933–2015) – the United Kingdom's Chief Missile Scientist
 Allen F. Donovan (1914–1995) WW2 aircraft, Atlas and Titan missiles, nuclear rockets
 Jimmy Doolittle (1896–1993) – instrument flying developer
 Étienne Dormoy (1885–1959) – airplane and autogyro designer
 Claude Dornier (1884–1969)
 Anatoly Dorodnitsyn (1910–1994) – researched meteorology, vortex wing theory, boundary layer theory in a compressible gas, and supersonic gas dynamics
 Donald W. Douglas (1892–1981) – founder of the Douglas Aircraft Company
 Iain Dowie (born 1965)
 George Dowty (1901–1975) – designer of aircraft components
 Charles Stark Draper (1901–1987) – developed inertial navigation
 Hugh Latimer Dryden (1898–1965) – researcher and NASA administrator
 Guy du Merle (1908–1993) – engineer, test flew captured Bf-109 and He-111 in Spain
 Alberto Santos Dumont (1873–1932) – inventor of the dirigible; aeronautics pioneer
 J. W. Dunne (1875–1949) – invented the first delta wing
 Pedro Duque (born 1963)
 William F. Durand (1859–1958) – propeller designer, NACA chair

E 
 George Edwards (1908–2003) – designer at Vickers-Armstrongs and BAC
 Joe Engle (born 1932)
  (1924–2021) – sailplane designer
 Robert Esnault-Pelterie (1881–1957) – aviation and rocketry pioneer, invented the center stick
 Walter Extra (born 1954)

F 
  (1909–1944) 
 Maxime Faget (1921–2004) – designer of the Project Mercury spacecraft
 Ole Fahlin (1901–1992) – propeller and prototype airplane developer
 Sherman Fairchild (1896–1971) – founded Fairchild Aircraft
 Charles Richard Fairey (1857–1956) – founder of the Fairey Aviation Company
 Farman Brothers
 Robert W. Farquhar (1932–2015) – NASA engineer, inventor of the halo orbit
 Roy Fedden (1885–1973) – British engine designer for Bristol Engine Company
 Antonio Ferri (1912–1975) – created the Ferri scoop used on the jet intakes of the XF-103, F-105, XF8U-3, and SSM-N-9 Regulus II cruise missile
 Gerhard Fieseler (1896–1987) – German aircraft designer
 Harold Finger (born 1924) – Project NERVA lead engineer
 Gary Flandro (born 1934) – NASA researcher, conceived the Planetary Grand Tour fulfilled by the Voyager program
 Alexander H. Flax (1921–2014) – developer of tandem helicopters and reconnaissance satellites
 Anton Flettner (1885–1961) - helicopter pioneer
 Nicolas Florine (1891–1972) – helicopter pioneer
 James C. Floyd (born 1914) – Avro Canada designer
 Henrich Focke (1890–1979) – helicopter pioneer
 Anthony Fokker (1890–1939)
 Henry Folland (1889–1954) – chief designer at Nieuport, Gloster, and Folland Aircraft
 Robert L. Forward (1932–2002) – designer of solar sails and space tethers
 Harlan D. Fowler (1895–1982) – Fowler flap inventor
 John Fozard (1928–1996) – Hawker Siddeley Harrier designer
 Anselm Franz (1900–1994) – jet engine pioneer
 Stelio Frati (1919–2010) – designer of several aircraft inc the SIAI-Marchetti SF.260
  (1909–1996) – first inventor of the area rule
 Leslie Frise (1895–1979) – designed the Type 156 Bristol Beaufighter
 John Carver Meadows Frost (1915–1979) – chief designer of the Avro Canada CF-100 and several VTOL projects
 Michimasa Fujino (born 1960) – Hondajet designer

G 
 Giuseppe Gabrielli (1903–1987) – aircraft designer
  – designer of the STOL IMAM Ro.63
  (1902–1971)
 Robert Gilruth (1913–2000) – engineer, NACA and NASA administrator
 Peter Glaser (1923–2014) – developed the solar power satellite
 John Glenn (1921–2016) – first American man to orbit the Earth in 1962
 Valentin Glushko (1908–1989)
 Robert Goddard (1882–1945) – scientist who developed the first liquid-fueled rocket 3-16-26
 Tadeusz Góra (1918–2010)
  (1903—1945) – co-developer of the LaGG-3
  (1902–1933) – designer and factory manager
 Fritz Gosslau (1898–1965) – V-1 flying bomb designer
 Arthur Gouge (1890–1962) – designed the "C-class" Empire and Sunderland flying boats, invented the Gouge flap
 Granville Brothers – GeeBee racers
 Jay Greene (1942–2017)
 Gus Grissom (1926–1967) – Apollo 1 fire victim on January 27, 1967
 Gordon G. Grose (1925-1993) – integrated fly-by-wire controls with engine inlets/nozzles and advanced pilot displays
  (1904-1983) – co-developer of the LaGG-3
 Leroy Grumman (1895–1982) – founder of Grumman Aircraft
 Siegfried and Walter Günter (1899–1969)(1899–1937) – jet aircraft pioneers
 Mikhail Gurevich (1893–1976) – co-founder of the MiG design bureau
 Bartolomeu de Gusmão (1685–1724) – Portuguese priest, aircraft designer
 Antanas Gustaitis (1898–1941) – Lithuanian aircraft designer, Brigadier General, Commander-in-Chief of Lithuanian Air Force

H 
 Wolfgang Haack (1902–1994)
 B. J. Habibie (1936–2019)
 Raoul Hafner (1905–1980) – helicopter pioneer
  (1924-1975) – sailplane designer
 Harry Hawker (1889–1921) – test pilot, formed Hawker Aircraft
 Willis Hawkins (1913–2004) – design lead of the L-133 and C-130
 Clinton H. Havill (1892–1953) – researched airships and propellers
 Richard E. Hayden (born 1946) – noise reduction developer
 Wallace D. Hayes (1918–2001) – discoverer of the area rule and hypersonics
  (born 1954) – sailplane designer
 Edward H. Heinemann (1908–1991) – Chief Engineer for Douglas Aircraft, designed 20 military aircraft
 Ernst Heinkel (1888–1958) – developed first jet rocket aircraft
 Chris Heintz (1938–2021) – kit plane designer
 Hall Hibbard (1903–1996) – Lockheed engineer
 Homer Hickam (born 1943) - NASA engineer, model rocketry enthusiast
 Stanley Hiller (1924–2006) – founder Hiller Aircraft
 Hellmuth Hirth (1886–1938) – aircraft engine designer, brother of Wolf Hirth
 Wolf Hirth (1900–1959) – sailplane designer, brother of Hellmuth Hirth
 Leonard S. Hobbs (1896–1977) – engine designer
 John Hodge (1929–2021) – Avro Canada, NASA
 Sighard F. Hoerner (1906—1971) – aerodynamicist, assisted the Fieseler Fi 156 Storch design
 Nicholas J. Hoff (1906–1997)
 Samuel Kurtz Hoffman (1902–1995) – rocket engine designer
 Kurt Hohenemser (1906–2001) – helicopter pioneer
 Walter Hohmann (1880–1945) – invented the Hohmann transfer orbit
 Peter K. Homer (born 1961)
 Stanley Hooker (1907–1984) – British engine engineer for Rolls-Royce Aerospace
 Ralph Hooper (1926–2022) – Hawker Siddeley Harrier developer 
 Jiro Horikoshi (1903–1982) – chief engineer for the Mitsubishi A6M
 Horten brothers (1913–1998) (1915–1994) – flying wing designers
 John Houbolt (1919–2014) – NASA engineer, lunar orbit rendezvous proponent
 Kathleen Howell – known for her contributions to dynamical systems theory applied to spacecraft trajectory
 Hsue-Chu Tsien (1914–1997) – aeronautical engineer
 Howard Hughes (1905–1976) – aerospace engineer, owned RKO movie studio
 Jerome Clarke Hunsaker (1886–1984) – pioneer of heavier and lighter than air aircraft
 Rick Husband (1957–2003) – died in the Columbia disaster
 François Hussenot (1912–1951) – inventor of one of the early forms of the flight recorder
  (1909-1990) – sailplane designer

I 
 Sergey Ilyushin (1894–1977) – founder of the Ilyushin design bureau
 Hideo Itokawa (1912–1999) – aircraft and rocket designer at Nakajima Aircraft Company

J 
 Mary Jackson (1921-2005) - NASA engineer
 Eastman Jacobs (1902–1987) – advanced wind tunnels, airfoils, turbulence, boundary layers, and Schlieren photography
 Hans Jacobs (1907–1994) – sailplane pioneer
 Antony Jameson (born 1934) – pioneered computational fluid dynamics
 Robert P. Johannes (1934–2004) – developed Fly-by-wire technology
 Clarence "Kelly" Johnson (1910–1990) – formed Lockheed's Skunk Works and led the design of the SR-71, U-2, F-117A, F-104, C-130, T-33, P-38, and Constellations
 Katherine Johnson (1918–2020) – mathematician who worked as an aerospace technologist at NASA
 Robert Thomas Jones (1910–1999) – aeronautical engineer at NASA
 Drago Jovanovich (1916–1983) – rotorcraft designer
 Charles Joy (1911–1989) – engineer at Armstrong Whitworth Aircraft, Gloster Aircraft Company. and Handley Page
 Hugo Junkers (1859–1935) – pioneered the design of all-metal airplanes

K 
 Rudolf Kaiser (1922–1991) – sailplane designer
 A. P. J. Abdul Kalam (1931–2015) – former President of India; "Missile Man of India"
 Charles Kaman (1919–2011) – helicopter pioneer
 Nikolai Kamov (1902–1973) – founder of the Kamov design bureau
 Abraham Karem (born 1947) – founder of UAV (drone) technology
 Alexander Kartveli (1896–1974) – Chief Engineer at Republic Aviation, and contributor to first aerospace vehicle prototypes
 David Keith-Lucas (1911–1997) – engineer at Short Brothers
 Mstislav Keldysh (1911–1978) – rocket and spacecraft designer
 W. Wallace Kellett (1891–1951) – Kellett Autogiro Corporation
 Thomas J. Kelly (1929–2002) – leader of the Apollo Lunar Module design team
 Alexander Kemurdzhian (1921–2003) – mechanical engineer who is best known for designing Lunokhod 1, the first ever lunar rover
 Sergey Khristianovich (1908–2000) – aerpdynamicst
  (1906–1991) – designer at Kawanishi Aircraft Company and ShinMaywa
  (1904–1986) – YS-11 designer
 Dutch Kindelberger (1895–1962) – Chief Engineer at Douglas Aircraft and head of North American Aviation
 Klapmeier brothers (born 1958) (born 1961) – founders of Cirrus Aircraft
 Milton Klein (1924–2022) – nuclear rocket engineer
  (1885–1961) – founded the Klemm Light Aircraft Company
  – aircraft engine designer, founder of the Klimov design bureau 
 Ave K. Kludze, Jr. (born 1967?) - NASA engineer
 Heinz-Hermann Koelle (1925–2011) – von Braun associate
 Yuri Kondratyuk (1897–1942) – first developer of the lunar orbit rendezvous concept
 Otto C. Koppen (1901–1991) – MIT professor, designer for Ford and Helio Courier
 Sergey Korolev (1907–1966) – Korolev rocket design bureau founder
 Gleb Kotelnikov (1872–1944) – parachute pioneer
 Frank Kozloski (1916–2003) – rotorcraft and missile developer
 Chris Kraft (1924–2019) – NASA administrator
 Eugene Kranz (born 1933) – aeronautical engineer
 Werner Krüger (1910–2003) – inventor of the Krueger flap
 Dietrich Küchemann (1911–1976) - aerodynamicist
 Nikolai Dmitriyevich Kuznetsov (1911–1995) – chief designer of the Kuznetsov design bureau

L 
 Gustav Lachmann (1896–1966) – designer at Handley-Page
 Barry Laight (1920–2012) – designer of the Blackburn Buccaneer
 Aarne Lakomaa (1914–2001) – involved in the design of the Saab 35 Draken and the Saab 37 Viggen
 Frederick W. Lanchester (1868–1946) – aerodynamicist
 Geoffrey A. Landis (born 1955) – NASA engineer, interplanetary exploration
 Samuel Pierpont Langley (1834–1906) – aircraft pioneer
 Agnew E. Larsen (1897–1969) – engineer at Curtiss and Pitcairn
 Conrad Lau (1921–1964) – lead designer of the XF8U-3 and A-7 Corsair
 Semyon Lavochkin (1900–1960) – founder of the Lavochkin design bureau
 Lovell Lawrence Jr. (1915 – 1971) - co-founder of Reaction Motors
 Bill Lear (1902–1978) – founder of Learjet
 Jerome F. Lederer (1902–2004) – aviation-safety pioneer
 René Leduc (1898–1968) – designer of the ramjet-powered Leduc 0.10
 Diane Lemaire (1923–2012) – first woman to graduate from the University of Melbourne with a degree in engineering
 Léon Levavasseur (1863–1922) – aviation pioneer
 David S. Lewis (1917–2003) – F-4 Phantom II program manager
 George W. Lewis (1882–1948) – NACA administrator
 Gordon Lewis (1924–2010) – turbine engine designer
 Robert Lickley (1912–1998) – Chief Engineer at Fairey Aviation Company
 Robert H. Liebeck – airfoil and blended wing body designer
 Otto Lilienthal (1848–1896)
 Charles Lindbergh (1902–1974) – made first solo transatlantic airplane flight from NY to Paris in 1927 on Spirit of St. Louis
 Per Lindstrand (born 1948) – balloons and other aircraft
 Alexander Lippisch (1894–1976)
 Claude Lipscomb (1887–1974) – designer of the Short Stirling
 Boris Lisunov (1898–1946) – engineered a copy of the DC-3
 William Littlewood – contributed to the design and operational requirements of transport aircraft
 Allan Lockheed (1889–1969) – co-founder of the Lockheed Corporation
 Malcolm Lockheed (1886–1958) – co-founder of the Lockheed Corporation
 Grover Loening (1888–1976) – awarded first ever degree in aeronautical engineering
 Robert Loewy (born 1926) – rotor-wing VTOL aircraft designer
 Roy LoPresti (1929–2002) – general aviation designer
 Samuel Jasper Loring (1914–1963) – researched aeroelastic flutter problems
 George Low (1926–1984) – aerodynamicist and NASA administrator
 Gleb Lozino-Lozinskiy (1909–2001) – General Designer of the NPO Molniya design bureau, lead designer of the Buran space shuttle 
 Heinrich Lübbe (1884–1940) – Anthony Fokker collaborator
 Glynn Lunney (1936–2021) – Apollo program
 Robert Lusser (1899–1969) – designer at Messerschmitt, Heinkel, and Fieseler
 Arkhip Lyulka (1908–1984)

M 
 Paul MacCready (1925–2007)
 Elsie MacGill (1905–1980)
 Ernst Mach (1838–1916)
 Georg Hans Madelung (1889–1972) – V-1 designer
  (1880–1944) – inventor of the Junkers flap
 Peyton M. Magruder (1911–1982) – lead designer of the Martin B-26
 Viktor Makeyev (1924–1985) – SLBM designer
 Frank Malina (1912–1981) – Rocket engineer, JPL administrator
 John C. Mankins – NASA space-based solar power researcher
 Frank E. Marble (1918–2014)
 Frederick Marriott (1805–1884)
 Glenn L. Martin (1886–1955) – founder of the Glenn L. Martin Company
  (1900–1984) – co-designer of the Fouga CM.170 Magister
 Hans Mauch (1906–1984) – jet engine pioneer, artificial limb developer
 Mark D. Maughmer (born 1950) – aerodynamicist
 Owen Maynard (1924–2000) – Avro Canada, NASA
  – Piaggio chief engineer
 William C. McCool (1961–2003) – died in the Columbia disaster
 James Smith McDonnell (1899–1980) – founder of McDonnell Aircraft Corporation
 Colin R. McInnes (born 1968) – solar sail researcher
 Marion O. McKinney Jr. (1921–1999) – NACA and NASA engineer, researched VTOL flight
 George J. Mead (1891–1949) – engine designer
 William C. Mentzer (1907–1971) – contributed to aircraft maintenance and economics
 Wilhelm Messerschmitt (1898–1978) – designed Bf 109 and jet powered Me 262
 Artem Mikoyan (1905–1970) – cofounder of the MiG design bureau
 Mikhail Mil (1909–1970) – founder and general designer of the Mil Moscow Helicopter Plant
 Alexander Mikulin (1895–1985) – engine designer, founded the Mikulin design bureau
 Frederick George Miles (1903–1976) – designer at Miles Aircraft, husband of Maxine Blossom Miles
 John W. Miles (1920–2008) - pioneer in theoretical fluid mechanics
 Maxine Blossom Miles (1901–1984) – pilot, designer, draughtswoman, aerodynamicist and stress engineer, designer of the Miles Hawk
 Arseny Mironov (1917–2019) – Russian scientist, aerospace engineer and aircraft pilot
 Don Mitchell (1915-1993) - sailplane designer
 R. J.  Mitchell (1895–1937) – designed the Spitfire aircraft
 Paul Moller – circular aircraft designer
 Montgolfier brothers (1740–1810) (1745–1799) – inventors of the hot air balloon
 John J. Montgomery (1858–1911)
 Albert Mooney (1906–1986) – general aviation designer
 Hans Moravec (born 1948) – space tether developer
 Morien Morgan (1912–1978) – 'Father of the Concorde'
 George Mueller (1918–2015) – NASA administrator
 Alan Mulally (born 1945) – Boeing executive and President of Ford
 Hans Multhopp (1913–1972)
 Elon Musk (born 1971) – founder of SpaceX and co-founder of Tesla
 Vladimir Mikhailovich Myasishchev (1902–1978) – founder of the Myasishchev design bureau

N 
 Aleksandr Nadiradze (1914–1987) – Soviet Georgian ballistic missile and rocket engineer
 James C. Nance (1927-2019) - Aircraft Nuclear Propulsion engineer
 Gerhard Neumann (1917–1997) – engineer for General Electric, contributed to the design of the J79
 Édouard Nieuport (1875–1911) – aviation pioneer
 No Kum-sok aka Kenneth H. Rowe (1932-2022) - North Korean MiG-15 pilot defector, US aeronautical engineer and professor 
 Umberto Nobile (1885-1978) - semi-rigid airship designer
 John Dudley North (1893–1968) – chief engineer at Boulton Paul Aircraft
 Robert B. C. Noorduyn (1893–1959) – Noorduyn Norseman designer
 Jack Northrop (1895–1981) – founded Northrop Corporation in 1939 and later the Flying Wing

O 
 Hermann Oberth (1894–1989) - rocketry pioneer
 Wendy Okolo (born 1984?) - NASA engineer
 Gerard K. O'Neill (1927–1992) – developer of the O'Neill cylinder for space colonization
  – Nakajima Aircraft Company

P 
 Frederick Page (1917–2005) – lead designer of the English Electric Lightning and the BAC TSR-2
 Thomas O. Paine (1921–1992) – engineer, scientist, NASA administrator
  (1904–1952)
 Paul C. Paris (1930–2017) – known for introducing fracture mechanics to the aviation industry
 Bob Parkinson (born 1941) – HOTOL spaceplane developer
 Jack Parsons (1914–1952) – rocket engineer, chemist, JPL founder
 Vladimir Pavlecka (1901–1980) - invented flush rivets, designed the ZMC-2 rigid airship and pressurized transports
 Nicolas Roland Payen (1914–2004) – delta wing developer
 Richard Pearse (1877–1953) – early New Zealand aircraft builder
 Jerome Pearson (1938–2021) – space elevator developer
 George Edward Pendray (1901–1987) - co-founder of Reaction Motors
 Harald Penrose (1904–1996) – test pilot and glider designer
 Vladimir Petlyakov (1891–1942) - founder of the Petlyakov design bureau
 W. E. W. (Teddy) Petter (1908–1968) – designer at Westland, English Electric, and Folland
 Frank Piasecki (1919–2008) – helicopter pioneer
 William Hayward Pickering (1910–2004) - rocketry pioneer, JPL director
 Percy Pilcher (1867–1899)
 Harold Frederick Pitcairn (1897–1960) – autogyro developer
 Curtis Pitts (1915–2005)
 Paul Poberezny (1921–2013) – founder of the Experimental Aircraft Association
 Hermann Pohlmann (1894–1991) – designer of the Ju-87 Stuka
 Nikolai Polikarpov (1892–1944) – founded the Polikarpov design bureau
 Boris Popov – invented one of the first successful aircraft ballistic parachute systems
 Henry Potez (1891–1981)
 Herman Potočnik (1892–1929)
 Ludwig Prandtl (1875–1953)
 Ronald F. Probstein (1928–2021) – researched hypersonics including re-entry vehicle design
 Ralph V. Pruitt (1936–1983) – integrated fly-by-wire controls with engine inlets/nozzles and advanced pilot displays
 Palmer Cosslett Putnam (1900–1984) - wind-power pioneer

Q 
 Qian Xuesen (1911–2009)

R 
 Arthur Emmons Raymond (1899–1999) – lead designer of the DC-3
 R. Dale Reed (1930–2005) – NASA lifting body designer
 Wendell E. Reed – developed jet engine controls
 Wilfrid Thomas Reid (1887–1968)
 Frederick Rentschler (1887–1956) – aircraft engine designer
 Judith Resnik (1949–1986)
 Osborne Reynolds (1842–1912)
 Richard V. Rhode (1904–1994) – researched aerodynamic loading
  (1906–1981) – designer at Bréguet Aviation
 Ben Rich (1925–1995) – director of Lockheed's Skunk Works; contributed to SR-71 and F-117 development
 G. Tilghman Richards (1884–1960) – annular wing designer
 John M. Riebe (1921–2011)
 Norbert Riedel (1912–1963) – developed jet engine starting motors
 Robert brothers (1758–1820) (1760–1820) – balloonists
 Tecwyn Roberts (1925–1988) – Avro Canada, NASA
 Frank D. Robinson (1930–2022) – helicopter designer
 Alliott Verdon Roe (1877–1956)
 Francis Rogallo (1912–2009) – NASA engineer, created the Rogallo wing which led to hang-gliding
 Gertrude Rogallo (1914–2008) – wife and collaborator of Francis Rogallo
 Harold Rosen (1926–2017) – electrical engineer known as "the father of the geostationary satellite"
 Milton Rosen (1915–2014) – lead designer of the Vanguard rocket
 Jan Roskam (1930–2022)
 Ludwig Roth (1909–1967)
 Carlo Rubbia (born 1934) – fission-fragment rocket proposer
 Edward J. Ruppelt (1923–1960) – director of Project Blue Book
 Archibald Russell (1904–1995) – designed the Concorde, Blenheim, Britannia, and Type 188
 Burt Rutan (born 1943) – airplane and spacecraft designer
 Tubal Claude Ryan (1898–1982) – founder of the Ryan Aeronautical Company
 Yuri Alekseevich Ryzhov (1930–2017) – aerodynamicist

S 
 Eugen Sänger (1905–1964) – spaceplane designer
 Irene Sänger-Bredt (1911–1983) – wife and collaborator of Eugen Sänger
 George S. Schairer (1913–2004) – lead designer at Consolidated and Boeing
 Helmut Schelp – jet engine pioneer
 Alexander Schleicher (1901–1968) – sailplane designer
 Paul Schmidt – V-1 designer
 Edgar Schmued (1899–1985) – lead engineer on the P-51, F-86, F-100, F-5, T-38
 Raemer Schreiber (1910–1998) – nuclear rocket engine designer
 Schweizer brothers – sailplane designers
 William T. Schwendler – co-founder of Grumman Aircraft Engineering Corporation
 Robert Seamans (1918–2008) – engineer, NACA and NASA administrator
 William R. Sears (1913–2002) – flying wing designer
 Ernest Edwin Sechler (1905–1979) – researched thin-shell structures
 Lucien Servanty (1909–1973) – SO.6000 Triton and Concorde designer
 Alexander P. de Seversky (1894–1974) – founder of Seversky  Aircraft, later Republic Aviation
 Joseph Francis Shea (1925–1999) – NASA Administrator for the Apollo Program
 Beatrice Shilling (1909–1990) – perfected the carburetor on the Rolls-Royce Merlin engine
 Leonid Shkadov (1927–2003) – aircraft development and optimization engineer 
 Nevil Shute (1899–1960) – aeronautical engineer and author
 Igor Sikorsky (1889–1972) – pioneered helicopters
 Ozires Silva (born 1931) – founder of Embraer
 Abe Silverstein (1908–2001) – engineer, NACA and NASA administrator
 Apollo M. O. Smith (1911–1997) - Douglas D-558-1 Skystreak, F3D, and F4D designer, pioneer in computational fluid dynamics
 Herbert Smith (1889–1977) – designer of the Sopwith Triplane
 Joseph Smith (1897–1956) – designer at Supermarine
 Ted R. Smith (1906–1976) – designer of the Aero Commander and Aerostar
 Thomas Sopwith (1888–1989) – Sopwith Aviation Company
 Percival H. Spencer (1897–1995) – designer of the Republic RC-3 Seabee
 Reginald Stafford (1903–1980) – designer of the Handley Page Victor
 John Stack (1906–1972) – Bell X-1 designer
 Lloyd Stearman (1898–1975) – founder of Stearman Aircraft
 Alan Stern (born 1957) – engineer and planetary scientist, principal investigator of the New Horizons mission to Pluto
 Homer Joseph Stewart (1915–2007) - helped develop Explorer 1, Pioneer 4, and several rockets
 Edward Stinson (1893–1932) – founder of the Stinson Aircraft Company
 Harrison Storms (1915–1992) – directed North American Aviation's Apollo Program
 William Bushnell Stout (1880–1956) - Ford Trimotor designer
 Ernst Stuhlinger (1913–2008) – ion engine developer
 Pavel Sukhoi (1895–1975) – founded the Sukhoi design bureau
 Joe Sutter (1921–2016) – chief engineer for the Boeing 747
  - aerodynamicist
 Victor Szebehely (1921–1977) – aerospace engineering and celestial mechanics

T 
 Max Taitz (1904–1980) – scientist in aerodynamics and flight testing of aircraft, one of the founders of Gromov Flight Research Institute
 Kurt Tank (1898–1983) – designer of aircraft in Germany, Argentina, and India
 Clarence Gilbert Taylor (1898–1988) – designer of the Piper Cub
 Moulton Taylor (1912–1965) – experimental aircraft pioneer
 Theodore Theodorsen (1897–1978) – aerodynamicist at NACA
 Richard G. Thomas (1930–2006) - aeronautical engineer and test pilot
 Mikhail Tikhonravov (1900–1974) - rocket and spacecraft pioneer
 Grigori Tokaty (1909–2003) - rocket engineer
 Alessandro Tonini (1885–1932) - designer at Gabardini, Macchi, and IMAM
 Myron Tribus (1921–2016) - deicer developer, heat transfer researcher
 Robert Truax (1917–2010) - Aerojet engineer, designer of the Sea Dragon heavy launch vehicle
 Richard Truly (born 1937) – former astronaut and head of NASA
 Konstantin Tsiolkovsky (1857–1935) - rocketry pioneer
 Sergey Tumansky (1901–1973) - engine designer, founder of the Tumansky design bureau
 Andrei Tupolev (1888–1972) – founder of OKB Tupolev

U 
 Ralph Hazlett Upson (1888–1968) - designed the world's only all-metal stressed-skin airship
 Oskar Ursinus (1877–1952) - sailplane designer
  (1877-1926) – dirigible designer

V 
 Sitaram Rao Valluri (1924–2019)[2] - researched metal fatigue
 Kermit Van Every (1915–1998) - high speed aircraft designer, Douglas Aircraft
 Richard VanGrunsven (born 1939) – prolific kit aircraft engineer
 Vladimir Vetchinkin (1888-1950) - aerodynamicist
 Walter G. Vincenti (1917–2019) - hypersonic aircraft designer
 Aurel Vlaicu (1882–1913)
 Richard Vogt (1894-1979) - designer of asymmetrical aircraft
 Gabriel Voisin (1880–1973) - aviation pioneer
 George Volkert (1891–1978) - designed the Handley-Page Halifax
 Wernher von Braun (1912–1977) – German rocket pioneer
 Theodore von Kármán (1881–1963)
 Hans von Ohain (1911–1998)
 Fritz von Opel (1899–1971) - rocketry pioneer
 Chance M. Vought (1890-1930) - founder of Vought Aircraft
 Traian Vuia (1872–1950) – first flight with no other ground devices

W 
 Gerhard Waibel (born 1938) – sailplane designer
 Dwane Wallace (1911–1989) – early Cessna CEO and designer
 Richard Walker (1900–1982) - main designer for jet aircraft of Gloster Aircraft Company
 Sir Barnes Wallis (1887–1979)
 Ken Wallis (1916–2013) – autogyro
 Hellmuth Walter (1900–1980) – rocket engines
 Joseph F. Ware Jr. (1916–2012) - Lockheed engineer and test pilot
 Edward Pearson Warner (1894–1958) - NACA research engineer
 Kyūichirō Washizu (1921–1981)
 Frank Wattendorf (1906—1986) - von Karman assistant, wind tunnel designer
 Johanna Weber (1910–2014) - aerodynamicist for the Handley-Page Victor and Concorde
 Fred Weick (1899–1993) - airmail pilot, NACA research engineer who designed the NACA cowl, and designer of the Ercoupe and Piper Cherokee
 Günter Wendt (1924–2010) – McDonnell Aircraft and North American Aviation engineer; pad leader, prepared all crewed Mercury, Gemini, and Apollo spacecraft
 Daniel Weihs (born 1942)
 Edward Curtis Wells (1910–1986) - Boeing executive and designer
 Ted A. Wells (1907–1991) - co-founder of Beech Aircraft Corporation
 Michael J. Wendl (born 1934) - developed terrain following technology, energy management theory, and integrated fly-by-wire controls with engine inlets/nozzles and advanced pilot displays
 Alexander Weygers (1901–1989) - discopter designer
 Ray Wheeler (1927-2019) - Saunders-Roe designer of rockets and hovercraft
 Orville A. Wheelon (1906–1966) - invented the Verson-Wheelon process for aircraft sheet-metal forming, introduced titanium fabrication
 Richard Whitcomb (1921–2009) - NACA/NASA inventor of the area rule, supercritical airfoil, and winglet
 Ed White (1930–1967) – Apollo 1 fire victim on January 27, 1967
 Gustave Whitehead (1874–1927) - aviation pioneer 
 Frank Whittle (1907–1996) – pioneer of the jet engine
 Michel Wibault (1897-1963) - invented vectored thrust
 Robert H. Widmer (1916–2011) - lead designer on the B-36, B-58, F-111, and F-16
 Sheila Widnall (born 1938) - fluid mechanics researcher
 Stanisław Wigura (1901–1932)
 Geoff Wilde (1917–2007) - Rolls-Royce engine designer
 Heather Willauer (born 1974) - United States Naval Research Laboratory researcher of jet fuel manufacture from seawater
 Oswald S. Williams Jr. (1921–2005)
 Sam B. Williams (1921–2009) - small fanjet engine developer
 Thornton Wilson (1921–1999) - B-47, B-52, and Minuteman missile designer
 Steve Wittman (1904–1995) – air-racer and aircraft designer
 Julian Wolkovitch (1932–1991) - promoted the closed wing
 Homer J. Wood - auxiliary power unit designer
 Pete Worden (born 1949) – NASA director
 Wright brothers (1871–1948) (1867–1912) – made first powered airplane flight on Dec 17, 1903 at Kitty Hawk, NC
 Theodore Paul Wright (1895–1970) - engineer and administrator
 Georg Wulf (1895-1927) - aviation pioneer
 James Hart Wyld (1912–1954) - co-founder of Reaction Motors, designed the rocket engines for the Bell X-1 and RTV-A-2 Hiroc

Y 
 Alexander Sergeyevich Yakovlev (1906–1989) – founder of OKB Yakovlev
 Mikhail Yangel (1911–1971) - founded the OKB-586 design bureau
 Chuck Yeager (1923–2020) – test pilot and first to break the sound barrier
 Ed Yost (1919–2007) - developer of the modern hot air balloon
 Arthur M. Young (1905–1995) - designer of the first Bell helicopter

Z 
 Stephen Joseph Zand (1898–1963) - solved many early aviation vibrations problems 
 Friedrich Zander (1887–1933) - rocket designer, solar sail and gavitational assist developer
 Filippo Zappata (1894–1994) - worked for Gabardini, Cantieri Riuniti dell'Adriatico (CANT), Blériot, Breda, and Agusta
 Engelbert Zaschka (1895–1955) – one of the first German helicopter pioneers
 Helmut Zborowski (1905–1969) - rocket and VTOL designer
 Ferdinand von Zeppelin (1838–1917)
 Nikolay Zhukovsky (1847-1921) - researcher
 Henri Ziegler (1906–1998) – father of the Airbus program
 Charles H. Zimmerman (1908–1996) - experimental aircraft designer
 Robert Zubrin (born 1952) - Mars Society founder, designer of the theoretical nuclear salt-water rocket

See also
 Boeing School of Aeronautics § Notable students
 List of German aerospace engineers in the United States
 List of Russian aerospace engineers
 Project Orion (nuclear propulsion) § Notable personnel

References 

Aerospace engineers
Aerospace